Provincial Trunk Highway 8 (PTH 8) is a provincial primary highway located in the Canadian province of Manitoba.  It runs from the north limit of the City of Winnipeg, where it meets with Route 180 (McPhillips Street), north to Hecla-Grindstone Provincial Park. The highway between Winnipeg and PR 230 is known as McPhillips Street. At PR 230, McPhillips Street becomes McPhillips Road and continues along PR 230 to PTH 9 (Selkirk Bypass). The route is a major road connecting Winnipeg with the communities of Winnipeg Beach and Gimli. The speed limit is 100 km/h (60 mph).

Route description

PTH 8 begins in the Rural Municipality of West St. Paul at an intersection with Emes Road on the Winnipeg city line, with the road continuing south into Winnipeg as Winnipeg Route 180 (Route 180 / McPhillips Street). The road heads northeast as a 4-lane divided highway to immediately have a cloverleaf interchange with PTH 101 (North Perimeter Highway) before traveling through rural areas, having intersections with PR 220 (Grassmere Road) and PR 321 (Miller Road) before entering the Rural Municipality of St. Andrews. PTH 8 has intersections with PTH 27 (Parkdale Road) and PR 230 (McPhillips Road) as it passes by the hamlet of Parkdale and the St. Andrews Airport before curving due north and narrowing to 2-lanes.

The highway has intersections with PTH 67 (Fort Garry Road), PTH 17, and PR 225 as it bypasses Selkirk,  Petersfield, and Dunnottar a few kilometers to the west, where it crosses Netley Creek at the hamlet of Netley and begins paralleling the western coastline of Lake Winnipeg. PTH 8   goes through a switchback near Melnice before entering the Rural Municipality of Gimli at an intersection with PR 229 near Winnipeg Beach.

PTH 8 has an intersection with PR 519 near Sandy Hook and crosses Willow Creek near Husavik before traveling through the town of Gimli, where it passes just to the east of former RCAF Station Gimli and has an intersection with PR 231 (which connects to the northern end of PTH 9). The highway bypasses several beach communities as it has an intersection with PR 324 and crosses into the Municipality of Bifrost - Riverton.

PTH 8 has an intersection with PTH 68 in Hnausa before crossing the Icelandic River and traveling through the town of Riverton, where it has an intersection with PR 329, which connects to PR 222. The highway now becomes more remote as it makes a sharp curve to the east, having intersections with PR 234 near Washow Bay and Grindstone Road (which provides access to Blacks Point and Grindstone). The highway turns southward to cross a narrow Causeway over a portion of the Lake Winnipeg Narrows onto Hecla Island, entering Unorganized East Division No. 18 and Hecla-Grindstone Provincial Park. It winds its way along Hecla Island to travel through the hamlet of Hecla Village, where the PTH 8 designation ends and the road continues north to a dead end at Gull Harbour.

Photo gallery

Major intersections

References

External links 
Official Name and Location - Declaration of Provincial Trunk Highways Regulation - The Highways and Transportation Act - Provincial Government of Manitoba
Official Highway Map - Published and maintained by the Department of Infrastructure - Provincial Government of Manitoba (see Legend and Map#3 & 5)
Google Maps Search - Provincial Trunk Highway 8

008